Hafshejan Sugar Factory or Karkhaneh Qand is a village two kilometers from the entrance of the Central District of this city Hafshejan of Chaharmahal and Bakhtiari Province in Iran.

The population 
This is Taqanak village in the district on the basis of the 1390 census, its population of 266 people (67 families) respectively. The village is populated by Persians.

References 

Populated places in Shahr-e Kord County